Doxa Kato Kamila Football Club is a Greek football club based in Kato Kamila, Serres, Greece.

Honours
 Serres FCA
 Winners (1): 2018–19

References

Football clubs in Central Macedonia
Association football clubs established in 1951
1951 establishments in Greece
Gamma Ethniki clubs